John Anthony Durkin (March 29, 1936 – October 16, 2012) was an American politician who served as a Democratic U.S. Senator from New Hampshire from 1975 until 1980.

Early life
Born March 29, 1936, in Brookfield, Massachusetts, Durkin was the youngest of four children, and graduated from St. John's High School in 1954. He later claimed that his parents told him that the highest callings in life were to become a priest or an honest politician, and that he opted for politics. At the age of 18, Durkin held his first elective office - Moderator of the Brookfield Town Meeting.

He went on to attend the College of the Holy Cross in Worcester, graduating in 1959. Through the U.S Navy ROTC program, he received his commission in the United States Navy as an Ensign. Durkin served in the Navy from 1959 to 1961, attaining the rank of Lieutenant (Junior Grade).

After his Navy service, Durkin enrolled at Georgetown University Law Center, where he earned his J.D. degree in 1965. He was admitted to the bar, and began to practice in New Hampshire. He served as an Assistant State Attorney General from 1966–68, and as State Insurance Commissioner from 1968 to 1973. He gained a degree of name recognition throughout the State, and frequently made headlines fighting insurance companies on behalf of consumers.

United States Senate

1974 Senate election

In 1974, Durkin won the Democratic nomination for the Senate being vacated by the retiring 20-year Republican incumbent, Norris Cotton. In the November 5 general election Durkin appeared to have lost against Republican Congressman Louis Wyman by 355 votes. Durkin requested a recount, which resulted in his victory by 10 votes. Governor Meldrim Thomson then certified Durkin as the winner. Wyman then requested a second recount, in which he prevailed by two votes. Senator Cotton resigned on December 31, 1974, and Gov. Thomson appointed Wyman for the balance of the term ending January 3, 1975, a common practice intended to give an incoming senator an advantage in seniority. Most thought this ended the disputed election, but Durkin appealed to the full United States Senate, which is the final arbiter of Senate elections under the Constitution.

The Senate Rules Committee, deadlocked on whether to seat Wyman for the 1975-1981 term, and sent the question to the full Senate. On January 14, 1975, the Senate returned the matter to the Rules Committee, which again returned it to the full Senate, enumerating 35 disputed points that questioned the election based on 3,000 questionable ballots. The full Senate was still unable to break the deadlock on even one of the 35 points. After seven months and six unsuccessful attempts by Democratic senators to seat Durkin, and much media attention in the New Hampshire press, Wyman proposed that he and Durkin run again in a special election. Durkin agreed, and the Senate declared the seat vacant on August 8, 1975, pending the outcome of the new election. In the meantime, Thomson again appointed Cotton as a caretaker until the new election was held. In the September 16, 1975 special election, Durkin defeated Wyman by over 27,000 votes. This ended what remains the longest Senate vacancy, following the most closely contested direct Senate election in the history of the United States Senate.

When asked about the experience of going through such a long-contested election many years later in 2008, Durkin told The Associated Press that he wouldn't wish the experience on his worst enemy. "I'd much rather have read about it than have lived it," he said. Having initially resisted the idea of holding a special election to resolve the matter, Durkin recalled in 2008, that it was eventually his daughter, 8-years-old at the time, who helped change his mind: "She said, 'Dad, don't you realize they can't make their mind up about anything?'," Durkin said. "When the kids realize it, I thought I had to do something."

Highlights of Senate service

For the first four years of his term, Durkin served alongside fellow Democrat Thomas J. McIntyre. This was the first time New Hampshire had been represented by two Democratic senators since prior to the Civil War. As a member of the senate Veterans Affairs Committee, Durkin authored a successful amendment to the 1976 Veterans Affairs Authorization, which extended GI Bill benefits to veterans of the recently concluded Vietnam War. Other highlights of his Senate career included his work on energy independence, alternative energy sources, and preserving Federal lands in Alaska for future generations. Durkin called for a Senate investigation into the International Brotherhood of Teamsters pension fund and its apparent ties to underworld crime. Durkin introduced an amendment to the Federal Election Campaign Act (FECA), which would have provided public financing of campaigns by providing free television and radio time, postage, and telephone service to all bona fide congressional candidates.

Working as a key Senate supporter of the legislation, and in coordination with staff of then Secretary of the Interior Cecil D. Andrus, Durkin played a key role in helping achieve successful passage of the Alaska Lands Act, enacted in 1980.

In 1976, the United States Coast Guard attempted to assert jurisdiction over two of New Hampshire's interior waterways, Lake Winnisquam and Lake Winnipesaukee, on the grounds that they could be navigated via the Merrimack River, which empties into the Atlantic Ocean.  Durkin led the successful Congressional effort to prevent the takeover, arguing that New Hampshire's government provided more effective oversight than the federal government could, and that the state government could not withstand the loss of revenue from boat registration fees.

1980 Senate election
Durkin was defeated in his 1980 Senate re-election bid by former state Attorney General Warren Rudman. He resigned early, six days before the end of his term, so Rudman could be appointed and gain a seniority advantage over other senators elected in 1980. Durkin resumed the practice of law and resided in Manchester. He sought New Hampshire's other Senate seat in 1990, but was defeated by Republican Congressman Bob Smith.

Death
In his later years Durkin resided at the New Hampshire Veterans Home, battling various ailments. He died on October 16, 2012 at Franklin Regional Hospital in Franklin, New Hampshire, aged 76. He had three children: John, Andrea and Sheilagh. He was interred at Arlington National Cemetery.

References

External links

|-

|-

1936 births
2012 deaths
20th-century American lawyers
Burials at Arlington National Cemetery
College of the Holy Cross alumni
Democratic Party United States senators from New Hampshire
Georgetown University Law Center alumni
New Hampshire Democrats
New Hampshire lawyers
Military personnel from Massachusetts
People from Brookfield, Massachusetts
Politicians from Manchester, New Hampshire
United States Navy officers